Sorgenfri Cemetery (Danish. Sorgenfri Kirkegård) is a municipal cemetery operated by Lyngby-Taarbæk Municipality in Sorgenfri in the northern suburbs of Copenhagen, Denmark.

History
The cemetery was established in 1903. It has later been expanded several times.

Description
The main entrance to the oldest section of the cemetery is located at Lottenborgvej, just west of Lottenborg Inn. Just inside the cemetery is a chapel from 1905. In front of the chapel is a statue of a mourning woman. It was created by the sculptor Olga Wagner. Together with her husband, the sculptor Siegfried Wagnerm she lived in a house across the street from the cemetery entrance.

List

References

External links

 

Cemeteries in Copenhagen
1903 establishments in Denmark
Cemeteries established in the 1900s